Vicentico (2002) is the first solo album by Argentine pop rock singer Vicentico. After his time with the band Los Fabulosos Cadillacs he went into a solo career when the band took a hiatus.

Track listing 
All tracks by Vicentico except where noted.

 "Culpable" (Guilty) – 4:00
 "Se Despierta la Ciudad" (The City Wakes Up) – 4:06
 "Todo Esta Inundado" (Everything is Flooded) – 3:42
 "Bajando la Calle" (Going Down The Street) – 4:50
 "Cuando Te Ví" (When I Saw You) – 3:37
 "Vamos" (Let's go) – 3:48
 "Quisiera" (I Wish) (Vicentico, Kike Santander) – 4:10
 "Chalinet" – 3:13
 "Algo Contigo" (Something With You) (Chico Novarro) – 3:38
 "68" – 3:55
 "Cancion de Cuna" (Lullaby) – 2:48
 "Cuidado" (Beware) – 4:30

Personnel 

 Dani Buira – drums, percussion
 Daniela Castro – bass guitar
 Daniela D'Eramo – backing vocals
 Silvio Furmansky – guitar
 Chonchi Heredia – vocals
 Virginia Módica – backing vocals
 Pablo Damian Neiman – backing vocals, harmonic, percussion
 Niño Josele – guitar
 Juan Pablo Quiroga – backing vocals
 Gonzalo Matias Ruiz – percussion
 Erving Stutz – brass arrangement, flugelhorn, trombone, trumpet
 Romina Vallone – backing vocals
 Vicentico – vocals, guitar, art direction, musical direction, producer
 Alejo VonDerPhalen – sax
 Carlos Martos Wensell – mastering
 Germán Wiedemer – keyboards

Technical personnel 

 Amadeo Alvarez, Walter Arce, Javier Caso – production assistant
 Walter Chacon – engineer, mixing
 Fernando Delgado, Sancho Gomez Escolar – mixing assistant
 Uriel Dorfman – assistant engineer
 Pompi Gutnisky – photography
 Eduardo Rivero – assistant
 Paco Martin – direction
 Manuela Schedlbauer – make-up
 Simona Martínez – wardrobe
 Javier Veraldi – photography, strings, video images
 Afo Verde – art direction, chorus, direction, music advisor, musical direction, producer

References

External links 
 www.vicentico.com
 Vicentico at MusicBrainz
 [ Vicentico] at AllMusic

Vicentico albums
2002 debut albums